Eric Peterson is an American basketball coach who is the current head coach of the South Dakota Coyotes men's basketball team.

Coaching career
While still in college, Peterson served as an assistant coach at La Crescent High School in La Crescent, Minnesota while also working with AAU teams in Wisconsin. In 2005, Peterson began his college coaching career as an assistant at Williston State, before moving on to join the coaching staff at Minnesota State–Moorhead from 2009 to 2011.

He'd return to Williston State, this time as an assistant coach and athletic director. In 2012, he'd be elevated to the head coaching position where he'd guide the Tetons to a 52–15 mark including at 2013 Region XIII championship and 2014 Mon-Dak Conference, while also earning coach of the year honors at the regional and conference levels too. Peterson would then join Craig Smith's staff at South Dakota, and follow Smith at his subsequent stops at both Utah State and Utah.

On March 16, 2022, Peterson returned to South Dakota, being named the 20th head coach in program history, replacing Todd Lee.

Head coaching record

NJCAA

NCAA D1

References

Living people
American men's basketball coaches
South Dakota Coyotes men's basketball coaches
Utah Utes men's basketball coaches
Utah State Aggies men's basketball coaches
Minnesota State–Moorhead Dragons men's basketball coaches
People from West Salem, Wisconsin
Basketball coaches from Wisconsin
Year of birth missing (living people)